The peled (Coregonus peled), also called the northern whitefish, is a species of freshwater whitefish in the family Salmonidae. It is found in northern Europe and Asia.

The peled is related to ciscoes of the   Coregonus sardinella complex.

Description
Smaller peled much resemble slim vendace or whitefish but as they grow larger they develop a deeper body which becomes less tapered and more blocky. The jaws are of equal length which is in contrast to the whitefish which has a snout longer than its lower jaw, and the vendace which has a projecting lower jaw. Another distinction is that the first gill arch has 50–65 gill rakers, a larger number than either of the other species. It has a dark back, silvery flanks and white belly.

Distribution and habitat
The peled is native to lakes and rivers of northern Russia. Its range extends from the Mezen River system emptying into the White Sea eastwards to the Kolyma River basin in eastern Siberia. It is a fish of rivers, reservoirs and lakes and it is possible that more than one species exist under the common name as there is considerable variation in growth rate, spawning date and other factors across its range.

Biology
The peled mostly eats zooplankton, but also consumes bottom-dwelling invertebrates, fish fry, algae and floating insects. Fish mostly become mature when about three years old and can live to about twelve years old. They spawn in autumn and winter over hard sand at the edges of lakes, and over sand, gravel and pebbles in rivers.

Uses
Although edible, the peled is not highly esteemed for cooking as the flesh is rather soft and tasteless. It is sometimes consumed raw. Peled is highly valued smoked and salted.

References

 

Coregonus
Fish described in 1788
Taxa named by Johann Friedrich Gmelin
Fish of Russia
Taxonomy articles created by Polbot
Endemic fauna of Russia